Donnybrook is a settlement in Harry Gwala District Municipality in the KwaZulu-Natal province of South Africa.

Village some 80 km southwest of Pietermaritzburg. It was named after Donnybrook, a suburb of Dublin, by Robert Comrie, the owner of the farm on which it was laid out.

Until the mid-1980s, it was the northern terminus of the Umzinto – Donnybrook narrow gauge railway.

References

Populated places in the Dr Nkosazana Dlamini-Zuma Local Municipality